Statistics of Swedish football Division 2 for the 1996 season.

League standings

Division 2 Norrland

Division 2 Östra Svealand

Division 2 Västra Svealand

Division 2 Östra Götaland

Division 2 Västra Götaland

Division 2 Södra Götaland

References
Sweden - List of final tables (Clas Glenning)

1996
3
Sweden
Sweden